Sibusiso Welcome Mdabe is a South African politician who was elected to the National Assembly of South Africa in the 2019 national election as a member of the African National Congress. He had previously served as the mayor of the iLembe District Municipality in KwaZulu-Natal and as the provincial chairperson of the South African Local Government Association.

In parliament, he serves on the Portfolio Committee on Employment and Labour.

References

External links
Profile at Parliament of South Africa

Living people
Year of birth missing (living people)
Place of birth missing (living people)
Zulu people
People from KwaZulu-Natal
Members of the National Assembly of South Africa
African National Congress politicians
21st-century South African politicians
Mayors of places in South Africa